The Revista Brasileira de Estudos de População (English: Brazilian Journal of Population Studies) is a biannual open access peer-reviewed academic journal publishing original research and review studies on demography, demographic analysis, and the demographics of Brazil and other countries. It was established in 1984 and is published by the Brazilian Association of Population Studies (Associação Brasileira de Estudos Populacionais), with support from the Conselho Nacional de Desenvolvimento Científico e Tecnológico (National Council for Scientific and Technological Development). Articles are published in Portuguese, Spanish, or English. Occasional supplements to the journal include only English-language articles, either in their original version or translated from Portuguese. Since 2005 the journal has been made freely available online through SciELO.

Abstracting and indexing 
The journal is abstracted and indexed in SciELO, Scopus, LILACS, Latindex, and Cicred.

External links
 
Associação Brasileira de Estudos Populacionais

Sociology journals
Multilingual journals
Creative Commons Attribution-licensed journals
Publications established in 1984
Lusophone culture
Demographics
Biannual journals
Academic journals published by learned and professional societies of Brazil